Babaera is a commune in Benguela Province in Angola.

References 

Populated places in Benguela Province
Municipalities of Angola